Henderson Park was a baseball park located in Henderson, TX and was the home to many Henderson baseball teams over the course of the facility. The remnants of the ballpark still exist and can be viewed behind the ancient middle school at Fair Park Street and South High Street.

Sources
 "Texas Almanac 2008-2009," The Dallas Morning News, c.2008

References

Baseball venues in East Texas
Baseball venues in Texas